Austintown is an unincorporated community and census-designated place within Austintown Township, Mahoning County, Ohio, United States. The population was 29,594 at the 2020 census. Located directly west of Youngstown, it is a suburb of the Youngstown–Warren metropolitan area.

History

Austintown Township was founded in 1793 as township 2, range 3 of the Connecticut Western Reserve by purchase from the Connecticut Land Company. It was surveyed as a parcel of land  on each side, as were other townships of the Connecticut Western Reserve. Austintown was named for Warren resident and Western Reserve judge Calvin Austin. In 1794, John McCollum of New Jersey became the first settler. Throughout the 19th century, the township slowly grew; by 1880, coal miners and their families increased the population to 2,502. A post office called Orange was established on November 15, 1815, and its name was changed to Austintown on May 6, 1872. It ceased operation on May 15, 1917, forwarding mail to West Austintown, Ohio. After World War II, Austintown experienced a population boom as suburban spillover from Youngstown crept into the eastern part of the township, whilst the central Austintown community grew along Ohio State Route 46. The census-designated place of Austintown was formally established by the U.S. Census Bureau in 1980, consisting of the urban portions of the township.

Geography
Austintown is located at  (41.091743, -80.738103). The Austintown CDP takes up slightly less than half of the area of Austintown Township, largely on the eastern side of the township, where it abuts the western border of the city of Youngstown.

Ohio State Route 11 is a north-south freeway which passes through the CDP, with access from Exit 39. Interstate 680 passes east-to-west through the northern part of the CDP but provides no access. Interstate 80 passes to the north of the CDP, with access from Exit 223.

Demographics

As of the census of 2000, there were 31,627 people, 13,419 households, and 8,762 families residing in the CDP. The population density was 2,709.3 people per square mile (1,046.4/km2). There were 14,179 housing units at an average density of 1,214.6/sq mi (469.1/km2). The racial makeup of the CDP was 92.51% White, 5.09% African American, 0.14% Native American, 0.59% Asian, 0.03% Pacific Islander, 0.43% from other races, and 1.21% from two or more races. Hispanic or Latino of any race were 1.83% of the population.

There were 13,419 households, out of which 25.8% had children under the age of 18 living with them, 49.6% were married couples living together, 12.1% had a female householder with no husband present, and 34.7% were non-families. 30.2% of all households were made up of individuals, and 11.4% had someone living alone who was 65 years of age or older. The average household size was 2.32 and the average family size was 2.90.

In the CDP the population was spread out, with 20.9% under the age of 18, 9.0% from 18 to 24, 27.3% from 25 to 44, 25.5% from 45 to 64, and 17.2% who were 65 years of age or older. The median age was 40 years. For every 100 females there were 90.8 males. For every 100 females age 18 and over, there were 87.7 males.

The median income for a household in the CDP was $38,216, and the median income for a family was $47,507. Males had a median income of $36,797 versus $23,733 for females. The per capita income for the CDP was $19,087. About 6.2% of families and 8.8% of the population were below the poverty line, including 14.4% of those under age 18 and 6.9% of those age 65 or over.

Estimates produced by the Census Bureau's American Community Survey program revealed that, by 2007, the percentage of individuals below the poverty line had risen to 13.8%.

Education
Children in Austintown are served by the Austintown Local School District. The current schools serving Austintown are:
 Austintown Elementary School – grades K-2
 Austintown Intermediate School – grades 3-5
 Austintown Middle School – grades 6-8
 Austintown Fitch High School – grades 9-12

Austintown has a public library, a branch of the Public Library of Youngstown and Mahoning County.

Notable people
 Kenneth Carano, member of the Ohio House of Representatives from the 59th district
 Aylett R. Cotton, member of the U.S. House of Representatives from Iowa's 2nd district
 Ron Gerberry, member of the Ohio House of Representatives from the 59th district
 Irv Holdash,  National Football League center and linebacker
 Laura Liu, judge for the Illinois Appellate Court for the 1st District
 Mike McGlynn, former National Football League guard
 Munnycat, indie pop duo
 Brian O'Nora, Major League Baseball umpire
 Jasper Packard, member of the U.S. House of Representatives from Indiana's 11th & At-large district
 Billy Price, active National Football League center for the New York Giants
 George Shuba, Major League Baseball outfielder and pinch hitter, remembered for breaking down the league color barrier by shaking hands with Jackie Robinson
 Davanzo Tate, former National Football League and Canadian Football League defensive back

References

External links
 Austintown Township
 Austintown Local Schools
 Town Crier

Census-designated places in Mahoning County, Ohio
1793 establishments in the Northwest Territory